Peyronnet is a French surname that may refer to
Albert Peyronnet (1862–1958), French politician
Dominique-Paul Peyronnet (1872-1943), French naïve painter
Jean-Claude Peyronnet (born 1940), French politician 
Pierre-Denis, Comte de Peyronnet (1778–1854), French politician

See also
Le Clos du Peyronnet, an arts and crafts garden in Menton, France

French-language surnames